The Landsmannschaft Schottland ("Scotland") is a German fraternity – not to be confused with the American variety – situated in Tübingen, a university city in south-western Germany. It is a brotherhood of students and alumni of University of Tübingen, with membership being a lifelong commitment.

Schottland was founded on 19 November 1849. The name comes from an early meeting place of members, a pub called the "Schottei". Since 1905, Schottland resides in its fraternity house, a multi-storey mansion in the style of a Scottish castle, on the top of a hill overlooking Tübingen.

The members of Schottland commit themselves to the principles of tolerance and democracy as well as the tradition of "akademisches Fechten" (academic fencing), a variety of fencing. A "Band" (a type of ribbon or sash) in the colours blue-gold-red and the traditional student cap (in Tubingen-style) in blue are worn by members. The colours are derived from the old Scottish royal colours. Schottland is a member of an association of about 100 fraternities, that practice obligatory fencing and wear colours – the Coburger Convent.

The fraternity's slogan is "Amicitia honos virtus" (Latin for: "friendship - honour - virtue") and its motto is "Vera amicitia fructus virtutis!" (Latin for: "true friendship is the fruit of the virtuous").

Notable members

Georg Bretschneider, former vice president of Bundesrechnungshof
Rolf Emmrich, professor of internal medicine
Friedrich Graf Medem, zoologist and representative of the IUCN Crocodiles Specialist Group in South America
Ernst von Mohl, professor in Saint Petersburg
Hugo Restle, former CEO of Agrippina Versicherungs AG (insurance company)
Friedrich von Riekert, DVP-politician in Prussia and member of Reichstag (German Empire)
Jonathan Roth, BDL-politician in Prussia and member of Reichstag (German Empire)
Karl Friedrich Schmidhuber, professor of Dentistry at the Heidelberg University
Heinrich Schönfelder, lawyer, founder of the well-known collection of German legal code "Schönfelder"
Alexander von Zagareli, professor at St. Petersburg University and co-founder of Tbilisi State University

External links

Landsmannschaft Schottland - Official website (in German)

1849 establishments in Germany
Student societies in Germany
Organisations based in Tübingen
19th-century establishments in Württemberg